Rocco Scott LaFaro (April 3, 1936 – July 6, 1961) was an American jazz double bassist known for his work with the Bill Evans Trio. LaFaro broke new ground on the instrument, developing a countermelodic style of accompaniment rather than playing traditional walking basslines, as well as virtuosity that was practically unmatched by any of his contemporaries. Despite his short career, he remains one of the most influential jazz bassists, and was ranked number 16 on Bass Player magazine's top 100 bass players of all time.

Early life
Born in Newark, New Jersey, United States, the son of a big band musician, LaFaro was five when his family moved to Geneva, New York. He started playing piano in elementary school, bass clarinet in middle school, and tenor saxophone when he entered high school. He took up double bass at 18 before entering college because learning a string instrument was required of music education majors. After three months at Ithaca College, he concentrated on bass. He played in groups at the College Spa and Joe's Restaurant on State Street in downtown Ithaca.

Career
Beginning in 1955, he was a member of the Buddy Morrow big band. He left that organization to work in Los Angeles. LaFaro spent most of his days practicing his instrument. He practiced from sheet music for the higher-pitched clarinet to improve his facility the upper register for bass. Fellow bassist Red Mitchell taught him how to pluck strings with both the index and middle fingers independently. For much of 1958, LaFaro was with pianist/vibraphonist Victor Feldman's band.

In 1959, after working with trumpeter Chet Baker, bandleader Stan Kenton, vibraphonist Cal Tjader, and clarinetist Benny Goodman, LaFaro returned east and joined Bill Evans, who had recently left the Miles Davis Sextet. With Evans and drummer Paul Motian he developed the counter-melodic style that would come to characterize his playing. Evans, LaFaro, and Motian were committed to the idea of three equal voices in the trio, working together for a singular musical idea and often without any musician explicitly keeping time.

By late 1960, LaFaro was in demand as a bassist. He replaced Charlie Haden as Ornette Coleman's bassist in January 1961. For a time, Haden and LaFaro shared an apartment. He also played in Stan Getz's band between jobs with the Bill Evans trio. Around this time he received a greeting card from Miles Davis suggesting that Davis wanted to hire him.

In June 1961, the Bill Evans trio began two weeks of performances at the Village Vanguard in New York City. The trio attracted attention for its style. The last day was recorded for two albums, Sunday at the Village Vanguard and Waltz for Debby.

Death
LaFaro died in an automobile accident on July 6, 1961, in Seneca, New York, on U.S. Route 20 between Geneva and Canandaigua, four days after accompanying Stan Getz at the Newport Jazz Festival. According to Paul Motian, the death of LaFaro left Bill Evans "numb with grief", "in a state of shock", and "like a ghost". Obsessively he played "I Loves You Porgy", a song that had become synonymous with him and LaFaro. Evans stopped performing for several months.

Instruments
LaFaro started his professional career playing a German-made Mittenwald double bass but it was stolen in the Spring of 1958.

Shortly after, he acquired a bass made in 1825 in Concord, New Hampshire by Abraham Prescott. The top of the instrument is a three-piece plate of slab-cut fir; the back is a two-piece plate of moderately flamed maple with an ebony inlay at the center joint; the sides are made of matching maple. It has rolled corners on the bottom and very sloped shoulders on the top, making it easier to get in and out of thumb position. LaFaro continued to play this bass until his death. The bass was badly damaged in the automobile accident that killed him, but was eventually restored and is sporadically used in performance to honor LaFaro.

Bill Evans said of LaFaro's Prescott bass: "It had a marvelous sustaining and resonating quality. He would be playing in the hotel room and hit a quadruple stop that was a harmonious sound, and then set the bass on its side and it seemed the sound just rang and rang for so long."

Posthumously released items 
In 1988, Insights label of RVC Corporation in Japan released Memories for Scotty. The album included five tracks recorded in New York City during 1961 with pianist Don Friedman and drummer Pete LaRoca.

In 2009, Resonance Records reissued five tracks from Memories for Scotty on Pieces of Jade, together with twenty-two minutes of LaFaro and Bill Evans practising "My Foolish Heart" during a rehearsal in 1960.
Also in 2009, the University of North Texas Press published Jade Visions, a biography of LaFaro by his sister Helene LaFaro-Fernandez, with an extensive discography.

Honors
On March 5, 2014, the Geneva (New York) City Council approved making April 3 Scott LaFaro Day. On April 4, 2014 a ceremony to rename a downtown street Scott LaFaro Drive took place.

According to Joachim Berendt, LaFaro's innovative approach to the bass caused "emancipation", introducing "so many diverse possibilities as would have been thought impossible for the bass only a short time before".

Bassist Charlie Haden recalled:

Discography

As co-leader 
 1960 with Steve Kuhn, Pete La Roca (PJL, 2005) – recorded in 1960

As sideman 
With Ornette Coleman
 Free Jazz: A Collective Improvisation (Atlantic, 1961)
 Ornette! (Atlantic, 1962)
 The Art of the Improvisers (Atlantic, 1970) – recorded in 1959-60
 Twins (Atlantic, 1971) – recorded in 1959-61

With Bill Evans
 Portrait in Jazz (Riverside, 1960)
 Explorations (Riverside, 1961)
 Sunday at the Village Vanguard (Riverside, 1961)
 Waltz for Debby (Riverside, 1962) – recorded in 1961
 The Complete Village Vanguard Recordings, 1961 (Riverside, 2005) – recorded in 1961
 The 1960 Birdland Sessions (Fresh Sound, 2005) – recorded in 1960

With Victor Feldman
 The Arrival of Victor Feldman (Contemporary, 1958)
Latinsville! (Contemporary, 1960)

With Don Friedman
 Memories for Scotty (Insights, 1988) – five tracks reissued on Pieces of Jade (Resonance, 2009)

With Stan Getz and Cal Tjader
 Cal Tjader-Stan Getz Sextet (Fantasy, 1958)

With Hampton Hawes
 For Real! (Contemporary, 1961) – recorded in 1958

With Booker Little
 Booker Little  (Time, 1961)

With Pat Moran McCoy
 This Is Pat Moran (Audio Fidelity, 1958) – recorded in 1957

With Marty Paich
 The Broadway Bit (Warner Bros., 1959)

With Gunther Schuller
Jazz Abstractions (Atlantic, 1960)

With Tony Scott
 Sung Heroes (Sunnyside, 1959)

References

Further reading
 LaFaro-Fernandez, Helen; Ralston, Chuck; Campbell, Jeffrey R.; Palombi, Phil (2009). Jade Visions : The Life and Music of Scott LaFaro. Denton, TX: University of North Texas Press. .

External links

A biography at Jazz Improv magazine with recommended recordings
Discography
Learning from Scott LaFaro
NAMM Oral History Interview with Helene La Faro January 18, 2007

1936 births
1961 deaths
20th-century double-bassists
20th-century American male musicians
American male jazz musicians
Musicians from Newark, New Jersey
American jazz double-bassists
Male double-bassists
American people of Italian descent
Road incident deaths in New York (state)
20th-century American musicians
Bebop double-bassists
Cool jazz double-bassists
Modal jazz musicians
Free jazz double-bassists